The 1915 Haverford Fords men's soccer team represented Haverford College during the 1915 ISFL season. It was the program's 15th season of existence. The season began on October 16, 1915 and concluded on January 22, 1916, with ISFL league matches occurring in November and December.

Haverford won their first ISFA national title since 1911, and their sixth overall national college soccer title. Freshman striker, John Crosman, led the Fords with 10 goals across 13 matches.

Roster

Schedule 

|-
!colspan=6 style="background:#c91631; color:#FFFFFF; border:2px solid #000000;"| Manheim Prize matches
|-

|-
!colspan=6 style="background:#c91631; color:#FFFFFF; border:2px solid #000000;"| ISFA season

|-
!colspan=6 style="background:#c91631; color:#FFFFFF; border:2px solid #000000;"| Non-conference matches
|-

|}

References

External links 
1915 Season Stats

Haverford
1915
1915
1915 in sports in Pennsylvania